Environmental Centre ARCTUROS commonly known as Arcturos, is a Greek ecological organization whose main activity is the preservation of the brown bear and its habitats, while also providing sanctuary to confiscated illegal pets such as wolves and lynx. It also maintains a Greek shepherd dog shelter which aims to donate trained shepherd dogs to farmers.

Activities
Brown bears once ranged all across Europe, but human encroachment on their forest habitats have made them an endangered species. Through the efforts of Arcturos, the size of the Greek brown bear population appears to have doubled in recent years. The organization also undertakes the rescue of bears kept captive in inhumane conditions—such as the "dancing bears", which are taken as cubs to be trained following the killing of their mother, as well as orphan bears and those improperly kept in zoos. It comprises a veterinary centre located in the village of Aetos, where animals are nursed back to health and a mountain sanctuary in the nearby Verno mountains close to the village of Nymfaio, an enclosed section of forest where the bears are transferred to be cared for and studied until they are able to be released back into the wild. The sanctuary also serves as an educational and study field for scientists and the public.

Name
In Ancient Greek Ἀρκτοῦρος (Arktouros) meant "Guardian of the Bear", ultimately from ἄρκτος (arktos), "bear" and οὖρος (ouros), "watcher, guardian".

References

External links
 Environmental Centre ARCTUROS 

Environmental organizations based in Greece
Animal welfare organizations based in Greece